Live in Germany 1976 is a live album released by Rainbow in 1990. The tracks are cherry-picked from a series of German dates during their world tour in September 1976 (Cologne on the 25th, Düsseldorf on the 27th, Nuremberg on the 28th, and Munich on the 29th). It was re-released two years later in the USA as Live in Europe on a different label. The content is the same for both although sleeve notes differ.

A remixed 6-CD box set Deutschland Tournee 1976 featuring three of the four German dates recorded in 1976 was released in Japan in 2006, with each concert being released as a separate 2CD package in Europe through the year.

Track listing
All songs written by Ronnie James Dio and Ritchie Blackmore except where indicated

Personnel
Rainbow
Ronnie James Dio - vocals
Ritchie Blackmore - lead guitar
Tony Carey - keyboards
Jimmy Bain - bass guitar
Cozy Powell - drums

References

Rainbow (rock band) live albums
1990 live albums